("Autonomous Society of Women of Barcelona") was a feminist organization in Barcelona active in the 1890s. The group advocated for women's self-emancipation, labor interests, and rights to participate in political and social life. Its headquarters, located in El Raval, held literacy and other educational classes, political debates, and recreational events.

Though there are some indications of group activity as early as 1889, the group was founded by Teresa Claramunt, Ángeles López de Ayala and Amalia Domingo Soler in 1891 with two major demonstrations.

The  replaced the Sociedad Autónoma in 1898.

References 

1891 establishments in Spain
1898 disestablishments in Spain
Feminist organisations in Spain